Hisonotus pachysarkos is a species of catfish in the family Loricariidae. It is a freshwater species native to Brazil, where it occurs in the Ivaí River basin in the upper Paraná River system. It reaches 4.15 cm (1.6 inches) SL and was described in 2016 by Cláudio Henrique Zawadzki and Weferson Júnio da Graça of State University of Maringá and Fábio F. Roxo of São Paulo State University. FishBase does not list this species.

References 

Otothyrinae
Fish described in 2016
Fauna of Brazil